Paul Mbwebwe Mbiya-Kalambayi (born 9 July 1999) is an English professional footballer who plays as a central defender for  club AFC Wimbledon. He is a product of the Brentford Academy and made his professional debut for AFC Wimbledon in 2017.

Career

AFC Wimbledon

Early years (2015–2018) 
After spells with Dulwich Village, Evolution Sports & Health Academy and Brentford, Kalambayi joined the academy at League Two club AFC Wimbledon in 2015. Despite being age 16, his rate of development saw him feature for the Development Squad before the end of 2015 and he was rewarded his first professional contract in February 2016. During the remainder of the 2015–16 season, Kalambayi was an unused substitute on two occasions with the first team squad. After the Dons' promotion to League One for the 2016–17 season, he was named in the first team squad list and was an unused substitute during two of the season's matches.

Kalambayi received his first call-up of the 2017–18 season as a substitute for an EFL Trophy group stage match versus Barnet and made his senior debut when he replaced Callum Kennedy after 66 minutes of the 4–3 victory. He made one further EFL Trophy appearance during the season and spent a month on loan at Isthmian League Premier Division club Tonbridge Angels.

Breakthrough (2018–present) 
Kalambayi was named as the Development Squad captain for the 2018–19 season and his EFL debut came with a start in a 2–1 defeat to Portsmouth on New Year's Day 2019. The match kicked off a run of five consecutive starting appearances before manager Wally Downes imposed a rest break on him. Kalambayi made 19 appearances during the 2018–19 season and helped the Dons preserve their League One status on the final day. He signed a new contract in June 2019 and was a near ever-present during the first four months of the 2019–20 season, before rupturing ankle ligaments. He returned to full training in March 2020, but did not appear again during the truncated 2019–20 season.

Following 19 appearances during 2020–21, quadriceps and medial collateral ligament injuries disrupted Kalambayi's 2021–22 season, restricting him to 16 appearances. He scored his first senior goal of his career in a 5–3 EFL Trophy win over Portsmouth on 7 September 2021 and signed a new -year contract in January 2022.

Personal life 
Kalambayi attended The Charter School.

Career statistics

References

External links 
 
 Paul Kalambayi at afcwimbledon.co.uk

Living people
English sportspeople of Democratic Republic of the Congo descent
English footballers
AFC Wimbledon players
1999 births
Association football central defenders
Footballers from Dulwich
Black British sportspeople
Tonbridge Angels F.C. players
English Football League players